The Auld Aisle Cemetery is located in Kirkintilloch, East Dunbartonshire, Scotland. The cemetery is protected as a category A listed building, and includes graves dating back to the eighteenth century.

History
The cemetery formed the grounds of St Ninian's Church, a pre-Reformation parish church. St Ninian's was abandoned after 1659, following the division of the old parish of Lenzie into Cumbernauld and Kirkintilloch. The watchtower dates from the early 18th century, and the gate lodge was built when the cemetery was extended in 1863.

Notable burials
 Alexander Bain (1811–1877), first to invent and patent the electric clock
 Beatrice Clugston (1827–1888), social reformer, philanthropist
 Archibald Couper (1831–1892), chemist
 John Ferguson (1836–1906), politician
 David Gray (1838–1861), poet
 Nicola Ann Raphael (1985–2001), bullycide victim

War graves
The cemetery contains the graves of 38 Commonwealth service personnel, 17 from World War I and 21 from World War II.

References

External links
 
 http://m.kirkintilloch-herald.co.uk/news/local-headlines/drivers-urged-to-respect-the-dead-1-3264113

Cemeteries in Scotland
Category A listed buildings in East Dunbartonshire
18th-century establishments in Scotland
Kirkintilloch
Commonwealth War Graves Commission cemeteries in Scotland